Nasiʾ (an-Nasīʾ, "postponement"), also spelled Nasii, or Nasie, was an aspect of the pre-Islamic Arabian calendar, mentioned in the Quran in the context of the "four forbidden months". In pre-Islamic Arabia, the decision of "postponement" had been administered by the Banu Kinanah, by a man known as the al-Qalammas (pl. qalāmisa). Different interpretations of its meaning have been proposed.

As postponement not related to a calendar fixed to seasons
Some scholars maintain that the pre-Islamic calendar used in Central Arabia was a purely lunar calendar similar to the modern Islamic calendar. According to this view, nasīʾ is related to the pagan practices of the Meccan Arabs, where they would alter the distribution of the forbidden months within a given year without implying a calendar manipulation. This interpretation is supported by Arab historians and lexicographers, like Ibn Hisham, Ibn Manzur, and the corpus of tafsir. Thus the Encyclopaedia of Islam concludes, "The Arabic system of [Nasīʾ] can only have been intended to move the Hajj and the fairs associated with it in the vicinity of Mecca to a suitable season of the year. It was not intended to establish a fixed calendar to be generally observed."

This interpretation is also corroborated by an early Sabaean language inscription, where a religious ritual was "postponed" (ns'ʾw) due to war. According to the context of this inscription, the verb ns'ʾ has nothing to do with intercalation, but only with moving religious events within the calendar itself. The similarity between the religious concept of this ancient inscription and the Qur'an suggests that non-calendaring postponement is also the Qur'anic meaning of Nasīʾ.

As lunisolar intercalation
Others concur that the pre-Islamic calendar was originally a lunar calendar, but suggest that about 200 years before the Hijra it was transformed into a lunisolar calendar containing an intercalary month added from time to time to keep the pilgrimage within the season of the year when merchandise was most abundant. This interpretation was first proposed by the Muslim astrologer and astronomer Abu Ma'shar al-Balkhi (787–886),
and later by al-Biruni (973 – after 1050), 
al-Mas'udi (c. 896–956), and some Western scholars.
This view was also held by the Quran scholar and translator Abdullah Yusuf Ali (1872–1953).

This interpretation considers Nasīʾ to be a synonym to the Arabic word for "intercalation" (kabīsa). It also suggests that every second or third year the beginning of the year was postponed by one month. The intercalation doubled the month of the pilgrimage, that is, the month of the pilgrimage and the following month were given the same name, postponing the names and the sanctity of all subsequent months in the year by one. The first intercalation doubled the first month Muharram, then three years later the second month Safar was doubled, continuing until the intercalation had passed through all twelve months of the year and returned to Muharram, when it was repeated. The Arabs, according to one explanation mentioned by Abu Ma'shar, learned of this type of intercalation from the Hebrew calendar used by the Jews, since intercalation was announced by the Nasi, meaning "prince", or "ruler". The Hebrew calendar commanded by Moses son of Amram, Mūsā bin ʿImrān, in Exodus 12, is necessarily lunisolar, because the lunar new year is fixed to the month of Aviv, or spring, and cannot rotate through the year.

Prohibition under Islam
In the tenth year of the Hijra, according to chapter 9:36–37, a prohibition of Nasīʾ was enacted:

The prohibition of Nasīʾ would presumably have been announced when the intercalated month had returned to its position just before the month of Nasīʾ began. If Nasīʾ meant intercalation, then the number and the position of the intercalary months between 1 AH and 10 AH are uncertain; Western calendar dates commonly cited for key events in early Islam such as the Hijra, the Battle of Badr, the Battle of Uhud and the Battle of the Trench, should be viewed with caution as they might be in error by one, two or even three lunar months.

This prohibition was mentioned by Muhammad during the Farewell Sermon which was delivered on 9 Dhu al-Hijjah 10 AH (Julian date Friday March 6, 632) on Mount Arafat during the Farewell Pilgrimage to Mecca.

The three successive forbidden months mentioned by Muhammad (months in which battles are forbidden) are Dhu al-Qi'dah, Dhu al-Hijjah, and Muharram, months 11, 12, and 1. The single forbidden month is Rajab, month 7. These months were considered forbidden both within the new Islamic calendar and within the pre-Islamic Meccan calendar.

See also
 Islamic calendar

References

Islamic calendar
Pre-Islamic Arabia
Quranic words and phrases